Šalgočka is a village and municipality in Galanta District of  the Trnava Region of south-west Slovakia.

History
In historical records the village was first mentioned in 1248.

Geography
The municipality lies at an elevation of 150 metres and covers an area of 4.747 km². It has a population of about 444 people.

External links
 Official page
http://www.statistics.sk/mosmis/eng/run.html

Villages and municipalities in Galanta District